Galle Gladiators  are a Sri Lankan franchise professional Twenty20 cricket team that competes in the Lanka Premier League,  Sri Lanka and  representing the city of Galle, Southern Province. Nadeem Omar, who owns the Quetta Gladiators in Pakistan Super League, purchased the franchise in 2020. Pakistan's veteran cricketer, Wasim Akram is the mentor of the team while Moin Khan and Azam Khan act as team's coach and manager respectively. Pakistan's star all-rounder, Shahid Afridi signed up as the marquee foreign player.

Seasons

Sponsors

Current squad 
 Players with international caps are listed in bold.
  denotes a player who is currently unavailable for selection.
  denotes a player who is unavailable for rest of the season.

Administration and support staff

Captains 

Source: ESPNcricinfo, Last updated: 13 May 2021

Current players

Statistics

By season 

 Last updated : 24 December 2022
 Source :ESPNcricinfo

By opposition 

  Last updated : 16 December 2022

See also 
 Galle Gladiators in 2020
 Galle Gladiators in 2021
 Galle Gladiators in 2022

References 

2020 establishments in Sri Lanka
Cricket clubs established in 2020
Galle Gladiators
Lanka Premier League teams